Stygia nilssoni is a species of moth of the family Cossidae. It is found on the Canary Islands.

References

Moths described in 2008
Stygiinae